In humans, the cartilaginous bar of the mandibular arch is formed by what are known as Meckel's cartilages (right and left) also known as Meckelian cartilages; above this the incus and malleus are developed. Meckel's cartilage arises from the first pharyngeal arch.

The dorsal end of each cartilage is connected with the ear-capsule and is ossified to form the malleus; the ventral ends meet each other in the region of the symphysis menti, and are usually regarded as undergoing ossification to form that portion of the mandible which contains the incisor teeth.

The intervening part of the cartilage disappears; the portion immediately adjacent to the malleus is replaced by fibrous membrane, which constitutes the sphenomandibular ligament, while from the connective tissue covering the remainder of the cartilage the greater part of the mandible is ossified.

Johann Friedrich Meckel, the Younger discovered this cartilage in 1820.

Evolution
Meckel's cartilage is a piece of cartilage from which the mandibles (lower jaws) of vertebrates evolved. Originally it was the lower of two cartilages which supported the first branchial arch in early fish. Then it grew longer and stronger, and acquired muscles capable of closing the developing jaw.

In early fish and in chondrichthyans (cartilaginous fish such as sharks), the Meckelian Cartilage continued to be the main component of the lower jaw. But in the adult forms of osteichthyans (bony fish) and their descendants (amphibians, reptiles, birds, and mammals), the cartilage is covered in bone – although in their embryos the jaw initially develops as the Meckelian Cartilage. In all tetrapods the cartilage partially ossifies (changes to bone) at the rear end of the jaw and becomes the articular bone, which forms part of the jaw joint in all tetrapods except mammals.

In some extinct mammal groups like eutriconodonts, the Meckel's cartilage still connected otherwise entirely modern ear bones to the jaw.

Additional images

References

External links
 

Skeletal system
Pharyngeal arches